The Batar is a river in Ukraine and Hungary. It is a left tributary of the river Tisza, which it joins at Tiszabecs. It flows through the villages Cherna, Hudia, Kholmovets and Magosliget.

References
 River Basin Report: Tisza River – Young Water Action Team

Further reading
 «Каталог річок України» — Видавництво АН УРСР, Київ, 1957.
 «Ресурсы поверхностных вод СССР». — Ленинград, 1967.

Rivers of Hungary
Rivers of Zakarpattia Oblast
International rivers of Europe